Club le Monde is an independent film released in 2002 and directed by Simon Rumley.  It is set in 1993 and tells the story of one Saturday night in a small London nightclub. It stars Allison McKenzie, Dawn Steele & Annette Badland.

External links
 
 

2002 films
British independent films
Films set in 1993
2000s British films